Mary Daugherty Abrams is an American politician. She represented the Democratic Party in the 2020 legislative elections, and was to the Connecticut State Senate for the 13th district. Abrams stated that she would not run for reelection in 2022.

Personal life 
Abrams is a former special education teacher who has resided in Meriden, Connecticut for more than 40 years. She has both a graduate and undergraduate degree from Southern Connecticut State University.

References

External links 
 

Living people
Politicians from Meriden, Connecticut
21st-century American politicians
Democratic Party Connecticut state senators
Women state legislators in Connecticut
Southern Connecticut State University alumni
21st-century American women educators
21st-century American educators
20th-century American educators
Schoolteachers from Connecticut
Year of birth missing (living people)
21st-century American women politicians
20th-century American women educators